Sa Zhenbing  (30 March 1859 – 10 April 1952) was a prominent Chinese admiral of the late Qing dynasty and the early Republic. He lived through four governments (Qing, Beiyang, Nationalist, Communist) in China, and had been appointed to various senior naval and political offices.

Early life
Sa Zhenbing was born in Fuzhou, Fujian province, to a Semu family of Qarluk origin who had lived in the area since the late Yuan dynasty. Between 1869 and 1872 he attended the Fuzhou Naval Academy; Deng Shichang was among his classmates. Between 1877 and 1880 Sa Zhenbing was among the first group of Fuzhou Naval Academy alumni sent abroad to study at the Royal Naval College, Greenwich in Britain.

Battle of Weihaiwei
After serving as a Chief Mate in the Nanyang Fleet, Sa Zhenbing became the youngest captain in the Beiyang Fleet. In 1895 he participated in the Battle of Weihaiwei during the First Sino-Japanese War, leading a group of sailors from the training ship Kangji in a ten-day defence of an island coastal fortress off Weihaiwei.

At that time the Japanese Admiral Itō Sukeyuki appealed to the Beiyang Fleet Admiral Ding Ruchang to surrender, promising him political asylum in Japan; Admiral Ding chose to commit suicide by handgun in his office at the Liugong Island headquarters. His deputy, Admiral Liu, after ordering that his warship be scuttled by explosives, also committed suicide by taking poison. Command of the Chinese Forces fell to Scottish-born Vice-Admiral John McClure, who completed the surrender negotiations with Admiral Ito. As the only captain still alive at the end of the battle, Sa Zhenbing was given the task of formally surrendering to Admiral Ito.

Later career
In 1905 Sa Zhenbing was appointed Admiral-in-Chief of the Beiyang, Nanyang and Guangdong Fleets (three out of four Qing's fleets), tasked with rebuilding the Imperial Chinese Navy after the defeat during the First Sino-Japanese War. Under his leadership the general efficiency of the Chinese naval personnel improved considerably.

During the Wuchang Uprising of 1911, Sa Zhenbing was ordered to sail to Wuhan to suppress the revolutionaries; upon realizing his sailors' revolutionary tendencies, he left his post on 1 November for Shanghai. Nonetheless he was appointed Minister of the Navy by Yuan Shikai, who at the time was the last Prime Minister of the Imperial Cabinet.

Sa Zhenbing briefly served as acting Prime Minister under the Beiyang government in 1920, then as Governor of Fujian Province from 1922 to 1926.

In 1949, near the end of the Chinese Civil War, Sa Zhenbing declined an offer by Chiang Kai-shek to evacuate him to Taiwan, instead pledging his allegiance to the Communist Party of China.

Sa Zhenbing died in his hometown of Fuzhou in 1952, aged 94.

See also
 Chao Ho-class cruiser

References

Citations

Sources

External links 
 

1859 births
1952 deaths
Qing dynasty admirals
Generals from Fujian
Chinese military personnel of the First Sino-Japanese War
Politicians from Fuzhou
Qing dynasty tidus
Graduates of the Royal Naval College, Greenwich
Chinese people of Turkic descent
Beiyang Fleet personnel
Republic of China Navy admirals